Benita Jaye Willis (born on 6 May 1979 in Mackay, Queensland) is an Australian long-distance runner, who is a three-time national champion in the women's 5,000 metres. Her foremost achievement is a gold medal in the long race at the 2004 IAAF World Cross Country Championships. She has also won team medals at that competition on two occasions. She has competed at the Summer Olympics four times (2000, 2004, 2008, 2012) and has twice represented Australia at the Commonwealth Games (2002, 2006).

At the 2003 IAAF World Half Marathon Championships she won the bronze medal with a time of 1:09:26 hours. In 2004, she won the 8K at the 2004 IAAF World Cross Country Championships and also the women's half marathon title at the Great North Run. She was 24th in the 10,000 metres at the 2004 Olympic Games. At the 2006 IAAF World Cross Country Championships she won her second career medal at the event by coming fourth in the short race and helping the Australian women to the team bronze medal. She set a time of 2:22:36 at the 2006 Chicago Marathon, a new Australian national record and an Oceania area record. She won the Berlin Half Marathon in 2007 in a personal best time of 1:08.28 hours. Her third international cross country medal came at the 2008 IAAF World Cross Country Championships as she finished eleventh in the long race to lead Australia to third on the team podium.

She finished third at the 2010 Great Ireland Run, recording a time of 34:28. In spite of a break of over three years without competing over the distance, she was the runner-up at the 2012 Houston Marathon with a time 2:28:24 hours (within the Olympic qualifying standard).

Willis was a training partner of Australian distance star Craig Mottram.

Achievements

Circuit wins

Cross country
Chiba International Cross Country: 2002, 2003, 2004
Cross de San Sebastián: 2005
Cross Zornotza: 2005
Cinque Mulini: 2005
Lidingöloppet 10K: 2009

Road
San Silvestre Vallecana: 2004
Great North Run: 2004
Great South Run: 2004 (First Australian to win)
Freihofer's Run for Women: 2006, 2007, 2008
Berlin Half Marathon: 2007
Great Yorkshire Run: 2007
Great Edinburgh Run: 2008

Recognition
In 2018, inducted into Australia Hall of Fame. Inaugural inductee to University of Canberra Sport Walk of Fame in 2022.

References

External links
Historical Results for Benita Johnson
World Marathon Majors Athlete Profile for Benita Johnson
Interview with Benita Johnson at Fastwomen.com
TheFinalSprint.com Podcast interview before running the 2007 LaSalle Bank Chicago Marathon

Living people
1979 births
Australian female middle-distance runners
Australian female long-distance runners
Australian female marathon runners
Sportspeople from Mackay, Queensland
Athletes (track and field) at the 2000 Summer Olympics
Athletes (track and field) at the 2004 Summer Olympics
Athletes (track and field) at the 2008 Summer Olympics
Athletes (track and field) at the 2012 Summer Olympics
Olympic athletes of Australia
Athletes (track and field) at the 2002 Commonwealth Games
Athletes (track and field) at the 2006 Commonwealth Games
Commonwealth Games competitors for Australia
Sportswomen from Queensland
World Athletics Championships athletes for Australia
World Athletics Cross Country Championships winners
Competitors at the 2001 Goodwill Games
University of Canberra alumni